SMS Frithjof was the third vessel of the six-member Siegfried class of coastal defense ships (Küstenpanzerschiffe) built for the German Imperial Navy. Frithjof was built by the AG Weser shipyard between 1890 and 1893, and was armed with a main battery of three  guns. She served in the German fleet throughout the 1890s and was rebuilt in 1900 - 1902. She served in the VI Battle Squadron after the outbreak of World War I in August 1914, but saw no action. Frithjof was demobilized in 1915 and used as a barracks ship thereafter. She was rebuilt as a merchant ship in 1923 and served in this capacity until she was broken up for scrap in 1930.

Design

In the late 1880s, the German  (Imperial Navy) grappled with the problem of what type of capital ship to build in the face of limited naval budgets (owing to parliamentary objections to naval spending and the cost of dredging the Kaiser Wilhelm Canal). General Leo von Caprivi, the new  (Chief of the Admiralty), requested a series of design proposals, which ranged in size from small  coastal defense ships to heavily-armed  ocean-going battleships.

Her hull had a long forecastle deck that extended most of the vessel's length. She was also fitted with a pronounced ram bow. Frithjof had a crew of 20 officers and 256 enlisted men.

Her propulsion system consisted of two vertical 3-cylinder triple-expansion engines, each driving a screw propeller. Steam for the engines was provided by four coal-fired fire-tube boilers that were vented through a single funnel.

The ship was armed with a main battery of three  K L/35 guns mounted in three single gun turrets. Two were placed side by side forward, and the third was located aft of the main superstructure. They were supplied with a total of 204 rounds of ammunition. For defense against torpedo boats, the ship was also equipped with a secondary battery of eight  SK L/30 guns in single mounts. Frithjof also carried four  torpedo tubes, all in swivel mounts on the deck. One was at the bow, another at the stern, and two amidships.

Modifications
In 1897, the ship had her anti-torpedo nets removed. Frithjof was extensively rebuilt between 1902 and 1903 in an attempt to improve her usefulness. The lengthened hull space was used to install additional boilers; her old fire-tube boilers were replaced with more efficient water-tube boilers, and a second funnel was added. Her secondary battery was increased to ten 8.8 cm guns, and the 35 cm torpedo tubes were replaced with three  tubes. Her crew increased to 20 officers and 287 enlisted men. Work was completed by 1900.

Service history

Construction – 1898

Named for the titular hero of Frithjof's Saga, Frithjof was laid down in February 1890 at the AG Weser shipyard in Bremen. She was assigned to II Division of the Maneuver Fleet, though she was still completing her trials, which prevented her from joining the unit for training exercises in March. She took part in the large-scale fleet maneuvers held in August and September, along with her sister ship . These maneuvers were divided into two phases. During the first, Frithjof and the other capital ships performed as the hostile French fleet, which was "attacked" by torpedo boats in the North Sea. The second set of maneuvers took place in the Baltic Sea, and Frithjof and the ironclads again simulated a French fleet. Frithjof thereafter became the flagship of the Reserve Division of the North Sea on 1 October.

In April her crew was replenished to allow the ship to take part in training maneuvers with the rest of II Division; at that time, KK August Carl Thiele relieved Bruch. Later in the year, the unit also cruised with the rest of the fleet in the North and Baltic Seas. Through this period, the ship came under a series of captains, including KK Oelrichs from May to June, then KK Hermann da Fonseca-Wollheim from June to July. Thiele returned to the vessel in July. The annual fleet maneuvers followed in August and September; during these, Frithjof was assigned to the temporary II Battle Squadron until 29 September, when the unit was disbanded. Frithjof then went to Wilhelmshaven, where she was placed back in reserve with a reduced crew, once again under Bruch's command. 

The year 1895 followed the same pattern as before, after the ship's crew was replenished in March under the command of KK Georg Alexander von Müller. Divisional exercises took place in the middle of the year, followed by fleet maneuvers in August and September. The normal peacetime training routine was interrupted in June by the opening of the Kaiser Wilhelm Canal, which was marked with a large naval review. Her crew was reduced once again in July, with the ship again under Bruch's command, though she was reactivated the following month under Oelrich. Frithjofs activity in 1896 repeated that of previous years, with KK Carl Derzewski in command, though on 14 November she resumed her role as the Reserve Division flagship. At that time, KK August von Heeringen relieved Derzewksi. The next two years passed similarly uneventfully beyond the normal training routine; the only event of note during this period was a cruise to Norway in 1898. During this period, KK Alfred Ehrlich commanded the ship from October 1897 to October 1898, at which point KK Eugen Kalau vom Hofe relieved him.

1899–1914

In June 1899, Frithjof made a lengthy visit to Copenhagen, Denmark, in addition to her normal training activities. That year, she and her sisters were assigned to II Squadron once again for the annual maneuvers. Kalau vom Hofe thereafter left the ship, being replaced by KK Gildemeister. The ship relinquished flagship duties in 1900, and was decommissioned that year. Work was completed by September 1903, and she was recommissioned on the 29th of the month under the command of KK Johannes Recke. After completing sea trials, Frithjof joined II Squadron of what was now designated the Active Battle Fleet.

In 1904, she took part in a fleet cruise to the Shetland Islands and Norway. After the fleet maneuvers ended in September, Frithjof was transferred to the Reserve Squadron and allocated to the Naval Artillery Inspectorate for use as a training ship. She joined the ships of the Training Unit for maneuvers in the Baltic from mid-May to early June 1905. In July, she and the coastal defense ship  conducted experiments with equipment to measure weather and air currents. The ship's activity for the year concluded with the annual fleet maneuvers; KK Max Witschel thereafter took command of the vessel. Frithjof then went to Neufahrwassar on 9 October. In 1906, Frithjof followed a similar routine to the previous year, operating with the Training Unit in the Baltic and North Seas and then with the combined fleet in August and September. During this period, KK Siegfried von Jachmann served as the ship's captain.

The ship joined Ägir and the light cruiser  for training exercises in Danzig Bay in January 1907. Frithjof then conducted individual training in February and March, before resuming operations with the Training Unit in the Baltic. Later in the summer, Frithjof and Ägir resumed training activities before the fleet exercises. That year, the ship was assigned to the newly formed III Battle Squadron. During the maneuvers, Frithjof lightly rammed Nymphe but did not cause serious damage. After the maneuvers, KK Carl Hollweg relieved Jachmann. Further exercises took place later in the year, concluding on 27 November. The year 1908 passed quietly for Frithjof; in September, after the annual maneuvers, KK Ferdinand Bertram replaced Hollweg. Frithjof conducted the same pattern of exercises with the Training Unit and the rest of the fleet in 1909 until the end of the annual maneuvers on 15 September. At that time, Frithjof and the rest of the coastal defense ships were decommissioned for the last time before the start of World War I.

World War I

After the ships were prepared for operations, they were deployed to Germany's North Sea coast on 14 September; five days later, Frithjof was stationed in the mouth of the Ems, where Lessel took command of the local defense forces. At that time, Ägir was also present, along with an auxiliary minelayer unit and several small support vessels. She remained on station there through 1915, though in June she was joined by Heimdall, whose commander outranked Lessel and therefore replaced him as the local commander. Frithjof continued to operate in the Ems after VI Squadron was disbanded on 31 August. She nevertheless saw no action during this period. 

On 5 January 1916, Frithjof was released from coastal defense duties and was sent to Kiel. From there, she proceeded to Danzig in company with Hildebrand and Odin on 10 January, where she was decommissioned six days later. She was then allocated to the U-boat Inspectorate for use as a barracks ship for U-boat crews stationed in Danzig, a role she filled for the rest of the war. Following Germany's defeat in November 1918, she was struck from the naval register on 17 June 1919. She was sold to the Arnold Bernstein Shipping Company of Hamburg. Frithjof was rebuilt as a merchant ship in 1923 at Deutsche Werke. A new superstructure more suited to a merchant vessel was erected and space in the hull for cargo was cleared. Still under the name Frithjof, she only served in this capacity for seven years, and was dismantled for scrap in Danzig in 1930.

Notes

References

Further reading
 

1891 ships
World War I coastal defense ships of Germany
Siegfried-class coastal defense ships
Ships built in Bremen (state)